Tunnel of No Light is the fourth studio album by death/doom metal band October Tide. It was released on March 25, 2013. Tunnel of No Light was produced by Jonas Kjellgren, and released by Pulverised Records, with whom the band had recently signed. It was the first album with an official second guitarist, Emil Alstermark, and the first album with an official bass guitarist, Mattias "Kryptan" Norrman. It is also the first album with Alexander Högbom on vocals. The sound of the new album is described as being a more direct and more heavy direction while maintaining the traditional sound of the band.

Track listing

Personnel

October Tide
Fred "North" Norrman – guitar
Robin Bergh – drums
Emil Alstermark – guitar
Mattias "Kryptan" Norrman – bass
Alexander Högbom – vocals

Additional personnel
Johannes Nordqvist Högbom – artwork
Kontamination Design – layout design

References

2013 albums
October Tide albums